Space Opera is a 1996 anthology of science fiction short stories and novelettes edited by Anne McCaffrey and Elizabeth Scarborough.

Contents
 Introduction (Space Opera) • essay by Anne McCaffrey and Elizabeth Ann Scarborough
 Bird in the Hand • short story by Anne McCaffrey
 Calling Them Home • short story by Jody Lynn Nye
 Saskia • novelette by Charles de Lint
 Songchild • short story by Robin Wayne Bailey
 A Song of Strange Revenge • short story by Josepha Sherman
 Our Father's Gold • novelette by Elisabeth Waters
 Thunderbird Road • novelette by Leslie Fish
 Scarborough Fair • novelette by Elizabeth Ann Scarborough
 Soulfedge Rock • short story by Suzette Haden Elgin
 Ever After • short story by Paula Lalish
 The Impossible Place • short story by Alan Dean Foster
 A Hole in the Sky • short story by Margaret Ball
 Drift • novelette by Steven Brust
 Heavenside Song • short story by Warren Norwood
 Swan Song • shortstory by Lyn McConchie
 Space Station Annie • short story by Cynthia McQuillin
 Roundelay • shortstory by Mary C. Pangborn
 The Last Song of Sirit Byar • novelette by Peter S. Beagle
 To Drive the Cold Winter Away • short story by Marion Zimmer Bradley
 Bluesberry Jam • novelette by Gene Wolfe

References

Science fiction anthologies
1996 anthologies
DAW Books books
Music books
1990s science fiction works